Sanaga is a rural locality (a selo) in Zakamensky District, Republic of Buryatia, Russia. The population was 1,832 as of 2010. There are 29 streets.

Geography 
Sanaga is located 78 km northwest of Zakamensk (the district's administrative centre) by road. Utata is the nearest rural locality.

References 

Rural localities in Zakamensky District